Jesús Vallejo Lázaro (born 5 January 1997) is a Spanish professional footballer who plays as a centre-back for La Liga club Real Madrid.

Club career

Zaragoza
Born in Zaragoza, Aragon, Vallejo joined Real Zaragoza's youth setup in 2008, aged 11. On 26 July 2013, after impressing in the Juvenil squad, he signed a new deal with the club.

On 23 August 2014, before even having appeared for the reserves, Vallejo made his professional debut, starting in a 0–0 draw at Recreativo de Huelva in the Segunda División. On 26 December, he further extended his contract until 2019.

Vallejo scored his first professional goal on 5 April 2015, the last in the 1–1 away draw against CD Tenerife. He was appointed team captain by manager Ranko Popović for that match, and remained in the role afterwards.

Real Madrid
On 31 July 2015, Vallejo signed a six-year contract with Real Madrid for a rumoured €6 million fee, being immediately loaned back to Zaragoza for one year. The following summer, he moved abroad after agreeing to a one-year loan deal with German club Eintracht Frankfurt.

Vallejo's maiden appearance in the Bundesliga took place on 27 August 2016, as he came as a late substitute in a 1–0 home win over FC Schalke 04. He scored his first goal also from the bench, contributing to a 2–2 draw to RB Leipzig also at the Commerzbank-Arena in the last match of the season.

On 7 July 2017, Vallejo was unveiled as a Real Madrid player and member of the first team squad for the upcoming campaign. He was handed the number 3 shirt, previously worn by Pepe. His official debut took place on 26 October, when he started and was sent off in the last minute of a 2–0 away win against CF Fuenlabrada in the Copa del Rey. His maiden appearance in La Liga occurred ten days later, when he partnered Sergio Ramos in the 3–0 home defeat of UD Las Palmas.

Profiting from injury to Nacho and suspension to Ramos, Vallejo made his debut in the UEFA Champions League on 11 April 2018, playing the entire 1–3 home loss to Juventus F.C. in the second leg of the quarter-finals, which still qualified to the last-four 4–3 on aggregate. It was his only appearance, as Madrid won their third consecutive and 13th overall title in the tournament.

On 27 July 2019, Vallejo moved to English Premier League side Wolverhampton Wanderers on a season-long loan. He made his competitive debut on 15 August, in a 4–0 home win against FC Pyunik in the third qualifying round in the UEFA Europa League. He played his first Premier League match on 14 September, featuring the full 90 minutes in the 5–2 loss to Chelsea also at Molineux. He made one further league appearance, but was not used again except for an EFL Cup tie in a side consisting largely of reserve players.

At the start of the January transfer window, Wolves' head coach Nuno Espírito Santo confirmed that Vallejo was likely to leave and added that the defender "had moments that he played, moments that he performed well, and some moments he didn't perform well ... Clearly it didn't work out". On 24 January 2020, he was loaned to Granada CF of the Spanish top tier until June; on 18 August, the move was extended for another year, and he featured 12 times in the Andalusians' quarter-final run in the Europa League for a total of 37 over the campaign.

Due to suspensions and injuries, Vallejo started in the 4–0 home victory over RCD Espanyol on 30 April 2022 as Real Madrid clinched their 35th league title, partnering Casemiro in central defence. He played only eight competitive matches during the season, however.

International career
On 7 March 2013, Vallejo appeared with the Spain under-16 team in a friendly with Hungary. He earned his first cap for the under-21s on 26 March 2015 at the age of 18, starting in the 2–0 win against Norway in Cartagena in another exhibition game.

Selected for the 2017 Under-21 European Championship finals by manager Albert Celades, Vallejo played four times for the eventual runners-up. Even though he was not part of the squad of 23 for the 2018 FIFA World Cup finals, he was picked by full side head coach Julen Lopetegui for a friendly with Switzerland to be held on 3 June.

Vallejo was one of 22 players selected by the under-23 team for the 2020 Summer Olympics, delayed until the summer of 2021 due to the COVID-19 pandemic.

Career statistics

Honours
Real Madrid
La Liga: 2021–22
Supercopa de España: 2021–22
UEFA Champions League: 2017–18, 2021–22
UEFA Super Cup: 2022
FIFA Club World Cup: 2018, 2022

Spain U19
UEFA European Under-19 Championship: 2015

Spain U21
UEFA European Under-21 Championship: 2019; runner-up 2017

Spain U23
Summer Olympics silver medal: 2020

Individual
UEFA European Under-21 Championship Team of the Tournament: 2019

References

External links

Real Madrid profile

1997 births
Living people
Spanish footballers
Footballers from Zaragoza
Association football defenders
La Liga players
Segunda División players
Real Zaragoza players
Real Madrid CF players
Granada CF footballers
Bundesliga players
Eintracht Frankfurt players
Premier League players
Wolverhampton Wanderers F.C. players
UEFA Champions League winning players
Spain youth international footballers
Spain under-21 international footballers
Spain under-23 international footballers
Olympic footballers of Spain
Footballers at the 2020 Summer Olympics
Olympic medalists in football
Olympic silver medalists for Spain
Medalists at the 2020 Summer Olympics
Spanish expatriate footballers
Expatriate footballers in Germany
Expatriate footballers in England
Spanish expatriate sportspeople in Germany
Spanish expatriate sportspeople in England